Seamus Coffey is an Irish economist and media contributor with a focus on the performance of the Irish economy and Irish macroeconomic and fiscal policy. 
He is a lecturer at University College Cork. He was chair of the Irish Fiscal Advisory Council (IFAC) from 2016 to 2020.

Career
Coffey authored the Irish state's review of the Irish corporate tax code in 2016 (the Coffey Report), whose findings were implemented in 2017–2018.  His bi-annual statutory IFAC reports on the sustainability of Irish State finances are covered in the Irish and international media.  In December 2017, International Tax Review named Coffey in its 2017 Global Tax 50.  Coffey maintains an economics blog called Economic Incentives, which was the first to show the source of Ireland's 2015 distorted GDP growth was Apple.

Coffey has won praise amongst financial commentators for the independence of IFAC's reports, and his role of 'financial watchdog' of state finances.

See also
 Morgan Kelly (economist)

References

Sources
REVIEW OF IRELAND’S CORPORATION TAX CODE – 2016 (Coffey Report), from the Department of Finance (Ireland) Website

External links
Economic Incentives, Seamus Coffey's economics blog
Irish Fiscal Advisory Council, Board profiles
UCC Business School: Seamus Coffey, Seamus Coffey profile page in University College Cork
Interview with Seamus Coffey, RTE News (May 2013)

21st-century Irish economists
1970s births
Academics of University College Cork
Living people